The R661 road is a regional road in County Tipperary, Ireland. It travels from the R660 road in Holycross to the R497 in Tipperary town, via Clonoulty and Dundrum.

References

Regional roads in the Republic of Ireland
Roads in County Tipperary